This is a list by date of coronations of British monarchs since 1066.

Kings and queens of England (1066–1603)
All took place in Westminster Abbey unless otherwise noted.

Kings and queens of Scotland (843–1651)

Kings and queens of England, Ireland and Scotland (1603–1707), of Great Britain and Ireland (1707–1801) and the United Kingdom (1801–present)
From 1603 onwards England, Ireland and Scotland were personally united under the same ruler (see Personal union).

See also
List of people involved in coronations of the British monarch

Notes

References

Coro